Joseph Gowing Kendall (October 27, 1788 – October 2, 1847) was a U.S. Representative from Massachusetts, son of Jonas Kendall.

Born in Leominster, Massachusetts, Kendall pursued classical studies. He graduated from Harvard University in 1810 and taught there from 1812 to 1817. He studied law, and was admitted to the bar in 1818 and practiced in Leominster. Kendall was elected to the Massachusetts State Senate in 1824 and served four years.

Kendall was elected as an Anti-Jacksonian to the Twenty-first and Twenty-second Congresses (March 4, 1829 – March 3, 1833). He was not a candidate for renomination in 1832. He was appointed clerk of the courts of Worcester County in 1833 and served until his death.

He moved to Worcester, Massachusetts, in 1833 and died there October 2, 1847. He was interred in Evergreen Cemetery, Leominster, Massachusetts.

References

Footnotes

1788 births
1847 deaths
People from Leominster, Massachusetts
Massachusetts state senators
Harvard University alumni
Harvard University faculty
National Republican Party members of the United States House of Representatives from Massachusetts
19th-century American politicians